The Minister for Labour was originally a position in the Government of the Irish Republic, the self-declared state which was established in 1919 by Dáil Éireann, the parliamentary assembly made up of the majority of Irish MPs elected in the 1918 general election. Constance Markievicz was the first person to hold the post. The office did not continue into the Executive Council of the Irish Free State.

The later office of Minister for Labour was created by the Ministers and Secretaries (Amendment) Act 1966 as a member of the Government of Ireland.

In 1993, the minister's functions were transferred to the Minister for Enterprise and Employment and was succeeded by the Minister for Equality and Law Reform, a position which existed during the Fianna Fáil–Labour coalition led by Albert Reynolds (1993–1994) and the Fine Gael–Labour–Democratic Left coalition (1994–1997) led by John Bruton. Its primary functions were in the area of civil and family law reform (including divorce legislation) and equality legislation. Under both governments, the Minister for Equality and Law Reform was Labour Party TD Mervyn Taylor, although Máire Geoghegan-Quinn served as Minister between November and December 1994, after Labour had left the coalition with Fianna Fáil.

In 1997, the minister's functions were transferred to the Minister for Justice, Equality and Law Reform. The Department of Equality and Law Reform ceased to exist but was not formally abolished. The functions formerly exercised by the Minister for Labour are now exercised by the Minister for Enterprise, Trade and Employment. The functions formerly exercised by the Minister for Equality and Law Reform are now exercised by the Minister for Children, Equality, Disability, Integration and Youth and the Minister for Justice.

History

Alteration of name and transfer of functions

Legislation introduced by the Department of Equality and Law Reform
The following legislation was introduced by the Department:
 Matrimonial Home Bill 1993 (struck down by the Supreme Court)
 Interpretation (Amendment) Act 1993 - providing for gender inclusive language in Acts of the Oireachtas
 Jurisdiction of Courts and Enforcement of Judgments Act 1993 - providing for international enforcement of civil judgments
 Maintenance Act 1994 - EC enforcement of maintenance orders
 Maternity Protection Act 1994 - implemented EC law on maternity leave
 Stillbirths Registration Act 1994 - provided for registration of stillborn children for the first time in Irish law
 Adoptive Leave Act 1995 - extended maternity leave-type rights to adoptive parents
 Civil Legal Aid Act 1995 - put civil legal aid scheme on statutory basis
 Family Law Act 1995 - reformed law relating to judicial separation
 Occupiers Liability Act 1995 - provided for reduced liability to trespassers and recreational users
 Fifteenth Amendment of the Constitution of Ireland 1995 - provided for divorce in the Constitution
 Civil Liability (Amendment) Act 1996 - provided for increased damages for fatal injuries cases
 Domestic Violence Act 1996 - extended remedies in domestic violence cases
 Family Law (Divorce) Act 1996 - introduced divorce on a statutory basis
 Powers of Attorney Act 1996 - provided for enduring powers of attorney
 Registration of Births Act 1996 - provided for gender neutral birth certificates
 Family Law (Miscellaneous Provisions) Act 1997 - miscellaneous amendments.

The following legislation had originally been drafted by the Department but later enacted under the Department of Justice, Equality and Law Reform:

 Children Act 1997 - extending family law entitlements of natural fathers and grandparents and other amendments
 Employment Equality Act 1998
 Equal Status Act 2000.

List of office-holders

Notes

Minister of State at the Department of Labour 1978–1993
Under the Ministers and Secretaries (Amendment) (No. 2) Act 1977, the government may appoint a member of the Oireachtas to act as a Minister of State in a department. The Minister of State did not hold cabinet rank.

References

Labour